Arthur George Brand (1 May 1853 – 9 January 1917) was a British Liberal politician.

Brand was the third son of Henry Brand, 1st Viscount Hampden, second son of Henry Trevor, 21st Baron Dacre. His mother was Eliza, daughter of General Robert Ellice, while Henry Brand, 2nd Viscount Hampden, was his elder brother. He entered Parliament for Wisbech in an 1891 by-election, and served in the Liberal administration of the Earl of Rosebery as Treasurer of the Household from 1894 to 1895. He lost his seat in the 1895 general election, but was again elected for Wisbech in 1900. Two years later he indicated in late 1902 to his constituency association that he would not contest the seat again, but he held the seat until the next election in 1906.

Brand married Edith, daughter of Joseph Ingram, in 1886, they had one son, Captain the Hon. Henry Arthur Trevor Brand of the 12th Royal Lancers who married Elsie, daughter of Canon Mark James. She died in April 1903. Brand survived her by fourteen years and died in January 1917, aged 63.

References

www.thepeerage.com

External links 
 

1853 births
1917 deaths
Liberal Party (UK) MPs for English constituencies
Treasurers of the Household
UK MPs 1886–1892
UK MPs 1892–1895
UK MPs 1900–1906
Younger sons of viscounts